Krupka is a surname. Notable people with this surname include:

 Anna Krupka (born 1981), Polish politician
 Jerzy Krupka, Polish scientist

See also
 

Polish-language surnames